Covariational Conditional refers to the most commonly used "the X'er, the Y'er" structure in English, for example:
 "The more I think about it, the less I understand."
 "The sooner, the better."
The structure is composed of two variables: an independent variable ('the X'er') and a dependent variable ("the Y'er"). It has also been called the 'comparative correlative construction'.
 
In construction grammar this pattern is considered a construction because the pattern is not predictable from any other fact of English grammar already established about 'the'.

'The normally occurs with a head noun but in this construction it requires a comparative phrase. The two major phrases resist classification as either noun phrases or clauses. The requirement that two phrases of this type be juxtaposed is another non-predictable aspect of the pattern. Because the pattern is not strictly predictable, a construction must be
posited that specifies the particular form and function involved' (Goldberg 2006, 6).

References

Lexicology
Rhetoric
Conditionals in linguistics